The eastern Montpellier snake (Malpolon insignitus) is a species of mildly venomous rear-fanged snake.

Geographic range
M. insignitus ranges from the eastern Adriatic coast in Italy, Slovenia, Croatia, Bosnia and Herzegovina, Montenegro and Albania, the southern Balkans in Bulgaria, North Macedonia and Greece, western Asia and Caucasus in Turkey, Cyprus, Syria, Israel, Jordan, Russia, Georgia, Armenia, Azerbaijan, Iraq and Iran, and along northern Africa in Egypt, Libya, Tunisia and Algeria.

Description
It usually has 19 dorsal scale rows on its mid-body, but males lack a dark 'saddle'. It often has narrow, pale longitudinal stripes.

References

Psammophiidae
Snakes of Africa
Reptiles of North Africa
Reptiles of the Middle East
Reptiles of Europe
Reptiles of Turkey
Reptiles described in 1827
Taxa named by Étienne Geoffroy Saint-Hilaire
Snakes of Jordan